Ahla Kuh (also Romanized as Āhla Kūh; also known as A‘lā Kūh) is a village in Sarchehan Rural District, Sarchehan District, Bavanat County, Fars Province, Iran. At the 2006 census, its population was 95, in 26 families.

References 

Populated places in Sarchehan County